Shipp is an occupational surname, originating from the Old English word scip (ship), and referring to a mariner, or a ship or boat builder. 

Notable people with the surname include:

Alana Shipp (born 1982), American/Israeli professional bodybuilder
Andrew Shipp (born 1979), Australian rules footballer
Billy Shipp (born 1929), retired Canadian Football League player
Charley Shipp (1913-1988), American basketball player and coach
Demetrius Shipp Jr. (born 1988), American actor
Ellis Reynolds Shipp (1847–1939), one of the first female doctors in the American West (Utah)
E. R. Shipp (born 1955), American journalist and columnist
George F. Shipp, American football coach
Harry Shipp (born 1991), American Major League Soccer player
Jackie Shipp (born 1962), American retired National Football League player
Jerry Shipp (born 1935), former American men's national basketball team player
John Wesley Shipp (born 1956), American actor
Josh Shipp (basketball) (born 1986), American basketball player
Josh Shipp (teen expert) (born 1982), American motivational speaker
Ken Shipp (1929-2012), American football coach
Marcel Shipp (born 1978), American football player
Matthew Shipp (born 1960), American pianist
Ray Shipp (born 1925), Australian former politician
Robbin Shipp, American attorney and politician
Scott Shipp (1839-1917), Confederate officer during the American Civil War
Stephanie Shipp, American economist and social statistician
Thomas Shipp and Abram Smith, lynching victims in 1930

English-language surnames
Occupational surnames
English-language occupational surnames